Bay 93.9 (stylised as bay 93.9, call sign: 3BAY) is a commercial FM radio station based in Geelong, Victoria, Australia. Commencing broadcasting in 1989, the station broadcasts an adult contemporary format.

History
Initially known as Bay FM, the station was originally licensed as part of a Commonwealth Government plan to increase the diversity of radio services in regional centres. The station's launch date is disputed - the Australian Communications and Media Authority, which oversees licensing of radio services in Australia, list the station's launch date as 10 December 1989, but some listeners suggest that broadcasts began two days earlier on 8 December 1989.

Just before the official launch of the station, the parent company of Bay FM purchased the flagging 3XY in nearby Melbourne, from the then owners of 2SM Sydney. Once Bay FM commenced broadcasting, 3XY briefly simulcasted the station overnight, retaining its soft rock format during the day. However, once new studios in Corio Bay were completed, Bay FM and 3XY began full-time simulcasting, 3XY breaking only for coverage of AFL (Australian Football League) games. After a period of 12 months, the then-Australian Broadcasting Authority demanded the two stations begin separate programming. While the two stations remained in their Corio studios, Bay FM relaunched with an easy listening format. In 1991, 3XY was sold to AWA Limited, owners of 2CH Sydney and other stations, who immediately shut the station down and re-opened it later that year as 3EE.

Bay FM was purchased by Grant Broadcasters, owners of rival 95.5 K-Rock, and the station relocated to the K-Rock building in the centre of Geelong. In 1999, Bay FM adopted the adult contemporary format it broadcasts today. In December 2015 the station changed its on-air name from "BayFM" to "bay 93.9" looking to a future when broadcasting in the digital DAB+ format and following the trend of stations to drop reference to the "FM".

In April 2018 bay 93.9 relocated from 30-year-old studios to new, more spacious, state-of-the-art digital broadcast facilities located on Level 1 of the same building as their previous (Level 3) Moorabool Street studios.

Announcers

Current Announcers
 Lisa (Milly) Millard - The Morning Crew 06:00 – 10:00 (6–10 am) weekdays
 Mark Hyland - The Morning Crew - 06:00 - 10:00 (6-10am) weekdays
 Craig Meddings (ex 3BA, 3GL, Krock) - 10:00 – 15:00 (10 am – 3pm) weekdays including "The FlashBack Lunch" from midday to 1pm  
 15:00 – 19:00 (3–7 pm) Weekdays The Catch Up with Daryl Reader & Roxie Bennett.
 Dave Ferguson - Bay Property Guide 8AM – 10AM Saturday

News Team
 Rob McLennan (News Director)
 Rebecca McDonald
 Cheandre Llewellyn
 Adam Spencer
 Lui Zacher 

Bay 93.9's newsroom is shared with sister stations 95.5 K-Rock and Kix Country 89.3 and is staffed 7 days a week. The newsroom also supplies a 7-day news service to sister station River 1467 in Mildura and weekend news services to 3BA and Power FM Ballarat, Gold Central Victoria in Bendigo, and South Australian stations 5RM, Magic 93.1, 5MU, Power FM Murray Bridge, 5AU, 5CS. Magic 105.9, 5CC, and Magic 89.9.

Former announcers
 Denis Walter - Afternoons at 3AW Melbourne
 Laurie Atlas - The Daily Agenda at 4CA Cairns
 Paula Kontelj
 Ken Lane
 Frank McKay
 Roger Kent
 Geoff Mason
 Mark Girdwood
 John Hood
 Ronnie Swintek
 Phil Baildon 
 Richard Millis
 Rob Elliott
 Gary Collins
 Peter Mobbs
 Hayden Miller
 Dave Gibney

References

Radio stations in Geelong
Radio stations established in 1989
Adult contemporary radio stations in Australia
Grant Broadcasters